Marianne Berg (born 1954) is a Swedish Left Party politician. She has been a member of the Riksdag since 2006 representing Malmö. She is openly lesbian.

References

External links
Marianne Berg at the Riksdag website

Members of the Riksdag from the Left Party (Sweden)
Living people
1954 births
Women members of the Riksdag
Swedish LGBT politicians
Lesbian politicians
21st-century Swedish women politicians
LGBT legislators